The following highways are numbered 124:

Cambodia 
 National Road 124 (Cambodia)

Canada
 New Brunswick Route 124
 Ontario Highway 124
 Prince Edward Island Route 124

Costa Rica
 National Route 124

Japan
 Japan National Route 124

United States
 Interstate 124 (unsigned)
 U.S. Route 124 (former)
 Alabama State Route 124
 Arkansas Highway 124
 California State Route 124
 Connecticut Route 124
 County Road 124 (Baker County, Florida)
 County Road 124 (Levy County, Florida)
 Georgia State Route 124
 Illinois Route 124
 Indiana State Road 124
 Iowa Highway 124 (former)
 K-124 (Kansas highway) (former)
 Kentucky Route 124
 Louisiana Highway 124
 Louisiana State Route 124 (former)
 Maine State Route 124
 Maryland Route 124
 Massachusetts Route 124
 M-124 (Michigan highway)
 Minnesota State Highway 124 (former)
 Missouri Route 124
 New Hampshire Route 124
 New Jersey Route 124
 County Route 124 (Bergen County, New Jersey)
 New Mexico State Road 124
 New York State Route 124
 County Route 124 (Montgomery County, New York)
 County Route 124 (Onondaga County, New York)
 County Route 124 (Steuben County, New York)
 North Carolina Highway 124
 Ohio State Route 124
 Pennsylvania Route 124
 South Carolina Highway 124
 Tennessee State Route 124
 Texas State Highway 124
 Texas State Highway Loop 124
 Farm to Market Road 124
 Utah State Route 124
 Virginia State Route 124
 Virginia State Route 124 (1924-1926) (former)
 Virginia State Route 124 (1928-1932) (former)
 Virginia State Route 124 (1933-1937) (former)
 Virginia State Route 124 (1937-1943) (former)
 Washington State Route 124
 Wisconsin Highway 124

Territories
 Puerto Rico Highway 124